The Red Bull Racing RB19 is a Formula One car designed and constructed by Red Bull Racing competing in the 2023 Formula One World Championship. The car was unveiled in New York City on 3 February 2023. The RB19 is driven by defending world champion Max Verstappen and Sergio Pérez. The car also marks the return of Honda as a named engine supplier to Red Bull Racing and AlphaTauri, with both teams' engines badged as Honda RBPT.

Complete Formula One results
(key)

Notes
* Season still in progress.

References

External links
 

2023 Formula One season cars
Red Bull Formula One cars